Rudbar-e Jonubi County is in Kerman province, Iran. The capital of the county is the city of Rudbar. At the 2006 census, the county's population was 86,747 in 17,364 households. The following census in 2011 counted 104,421 people in 24,506 households. At the 2016 census, the county's population was 105,992 in 27,428 households.

Administrative divisions

The population history and structural changes of Rudbar-e Jonubi County's administrative divisions over three consecutive censuses are shown in the following table. The latest census shows two districts, four rural districts, and two cities.

References

 

Counties of Kerman Province